Launch Complex 39A (LC-39A) is the first of Launch Complex 39's three launch pads, located at NASA's Kennedy Space Center in Merritt Island, Florida. The pad, along with Launch Complex 39B, were first designed for the Saturn V launch vehicle. Typically used to launch NASA's crewed spaceflight missions since the late 1960s, the pad was leased by SpaceX and has been modified to support their launch vehicles.

History

Apollo program 
In 1961, President Kennedy proposed to Congress the goal of landing a man on the Moon by the end of the decade. Congressional approval led to the launch of the Apollo program, which required a massive expansion of NASA operations, including an expansion of launch operations from the Cape to adjacent Merritt Island to the north and west.

First, Launch Complex 39C, Launch Complex 39A was designed to handle launches of the Saturn V rocket, the largest and most powerful launch vehicle, which would propel Apollo spacecraft to the Moon. The first launch from Launch Complex 39A came in 1967 with the first Saturn V launch, which carried the uncrewed Apollo 4 spacecraft. The second uncrewed launch, Apollo 6, also used Pad 39A. With the exception of Apollo 10, which used Pad 39B (due to the "all-up" testing resulting in a 2-month turnaround period), all crewed Apollo-Saturn V launches, commencing with Apollo 8, used Pad 39A.

Skylab program 
Launch Complex 39A was used for the uncrewed launch of the of Skylab space station on May 14, 1973. This utilised a modified Saturn V originally built for the cancelled Apollo 18 mission. The subsequent Skylab crewed missions launched from Launch Complex 39B using Saturn IB launch vehicles.

Space Shuttle 
With the advent of the Space Shuttle program in the early 1980s, the original structure of the launch pads were remodeled for the needs of the Space Shuttle. The first usage of Pad 39A for the Space Shuttle came in 1979, when Enterprise was used to check the facilities prior to the first operational launch. Since then, Pad 39A hosted all Space Shuttle launches until January 1986, when  would become the first to launch from pad 39B during the ill-fated STS-51-L mission.

During the launch of Discovery on STS-124 on May 31, 2008. The pad at LC-39A suffered extensive damage, in particular to the concrete trench used to deflect the SRBs' flames. The subsequent investigation found that the damage was the result of carbonation of epoxy and corrosion of steel anchors that held the refractory bricks in the trench in place. The damage had been exacerbated by the fact that hydrochloric acid is an exhaust by-product of the solid rocket boosters.

Just as for the first 24 shuttle flights, LC-39A supported the final shuttle flights, starting with STS-117 in June 2007 and ending with the retirement of the Shuttle fleet in July 2011. Prior to the SpaceX lease agreement, the pad remained as it was when Atlantis launched on the final shuttle mission on July 8, 2011, complete with a mobile launcher platform.

SpaceX 

Talks for use of the pad were underway between NASA and Space Florida — the State of Florida's economic development agency — as early as 2011, but no deal materialized by 2012, and NASA then pursued other options for removing the pad from the federal government inventory.

By early 2013, NASA publicly announced that it would allow commercial launch providers to lease LC-39A, and followed that, in May 2013, with a formal solicitation for proposals for commercial use of the pad.  There were two competing bids for the commercial use of the launch complex. SpaceX submitted a bid for exclusive use of the launch complex, while Jeff Bezos' Blue Origin submitted a bid for shared non-exclusive use of the complex, so that the launchpad would handle multiple vehicles, and costs could be shared over the long-term. One potential shared user in the Blue Origin plan was United Launch Alliance. Prior to the end of the bid period, and prior to any public announcement by NASA of the results of the process, Blue Origin filed a protest with the U.S. General Accounting Office (GAO) "over what it says is a plan by NASA to award an exclusive commercial lease to SpaceX for use of mothballed space shuttle launch pad 39A". NASA had planned to complete the bid award and have the pad transferred by October 1, 2013, but the protest "will delay any decision until the GAO reaches a decision, expected by mid-December". On December 12, 2013, the GAO denied the protest and sided with NASA, which argued that the solicitation contained no preference on the use of the facility as multi-use or single-use. "The [solicitation] document merely asks bidders to explain their reasons for selecting one approach instead of the other and how they would manage the facility".

On December 13, 2013, NASA announced that it had selected SpaceX as the new commercial tenant. On April 14, 2014, SpaceX signed a lease agreement that gave it a 20-year exclusive lease on LC-39A. SpaceX planned to launch their launch vehicles from the pad and build a new hangar nearby. Elon Musk, CEO of SpaceX, stated that he wanted to shift most of SpaceX's NASA launches to LC-39A, including commercial cargo and crew missions to the International Space Station.

Modifications 
In 2015, SpaceX built the Horizontal Integration Facility (HIF) just outside the perimeter of the existing launch pad in order to house both the Falcon 9 and the Falcon Heavy rockets, and their associated hardware and payloads, during preparation for flight. Both types of launch vehicles are transported from the HIF to the launch pad aboard a Transporter Erector (TE) which rides on rails up the former crawlerway path. Also in 2015, the launch mount for the Falcon Heavy was constructed on Pad 39A over the existing infrastructure. The work on both the HIF building and the pad was substantially complete by late 2015. A rollout test of the new Transporter Erector was conducted in November 2015.

In February 2016, SpaceX indicated that they had "completed and activated Launch Complex 39A", but still had more work yet to do to support crewed flights. SpaceX originally planned to be ready to accomplish the first launch at pad 39A — of a Falcon Heavy — as early as 2015, as they had had architects and engineers working on the new design and modifications since 2013. By late 2014, a preliminary date for a wet dress rehearsal of the Falcon Heavy was set for no earlier than July 1, 2015. Due to a failure in a June 2015 Falcon 9 launch, SpaceX had to delay launching the Falcon Heavy in order to focus on the Falcon 9's failure investigation and its return to flight. In early 2016, considering the busy Falcon 9 launch manifest, it became unclear if the Falcon Heavy would be the first vehicle to launch from Pad 39A, or if one or more Falcon 9 missions would precede a Falcon Heavy launch. In the following months, the Falcon Heavy launch was delayed multiple times and eventually pushed back to February 2018.

In 2019, SpaceX began substantial modification to LC 39A in order to begin work on phase 1 of the construction to prepare the facility to launch prototypes of the large -diameter methalox reusable rocket — Starship — from a launch stand, which will fly from 39A on suborbital test flight trajectories with six or fewer Raptor engines. A second phase of the construction is planned for 2020 to build a much more capable launch mount capable of launching the entire Starship launch vehicle, powered by 33 Raptor engines and producing a total of  liftoff thrust when departing 39A.

Launch history 
The first SpaceX launch from pad 39A was SpaceX CRS-10 on February 19, 2017, using a Falcon 9 launch vehicle; it was the company's 10th cargo resupply mission to the International Space Station, and the first uncrewed launch from 39A since Skylab.

While Cape Canaveral Space Launch Complex 40 (SLC-40) was undergoing reconstruction after the loss of the AMOS-6 satellite on September 1, 2016, all SpaceX's east coast launches were from Pad 39A until SLC-40 became operational again in December 2017. These included the May 1, 2017, launch of NROL-76, the first SpaceX mission for the National Reconnaissance Office, with a classified payload.

On February 6, 2018, Pad 39A hosted the successful liftoff of the Falcon Heavy on its maiden launch, carrying Elon Musk's Tesla Roadster car to space; and the first flight of the human-rated spacecraft ; (Demo-1) took place there on March 2, 2019.

The second Falcon Heavy flight, carrying the Arabsat-6A communications satellite for Arabsat of Saudi Arabia, successfully launched on April 11, 2019. The satellite is to provide Ku-band and Ka-band communication services for the Middle East and northern Africa, as well as for South Africa. The launch was notable as it marked the first time that SpaceX was able to successfully soft-land all three of the reusable booster stages, which will be refurbished for future launches.

The Crew Dragon Demo-2 test flight launched with astronauts Bob Behnken and Doug Hurley from Launch Complex 39A on 30 May 2020, and docked to pressurised mating adapter PMA-2 on the Harmony module of the ISS on 31 May 2020.
The first operational Commercial Crew mission Crew-1 was launched on November 15, 2020.

Launch statistics

Current status 
On April 14, 2014, the private American aerospace manufacturer and space transportation services company SpaceX signed a lease agreement that gave it a 20-year exclusive lease on LC-39A. SpaceX has launched their launch vehicles from the pad and built a new hangar nearby.

Elon Musk, CEO of SpaceX, stated that he wanted to shift most of SpaceX's NASA launches to LC-39A, including commercial cargo and crew missions to the International Space Station.

SpaceX utilizes the former Fixed Service Structure (FSS) of the Pad 39A launch towers and intends to extend it above its former  height. It did not need the Rotating Service Structure (RSS) and removed it beginning in February 2016.

NASA removed the Orbiter Servicing Arm — with intent to use the space later to build a museum — and the white room by which astronauts entered the Space Shuttle. SpaceX indicated in late 2014 that additional levels to the FSS would not be added in the near term. SpaceX plans to eventually add at least two additional levels to the FSS, to provide crew access for the Dragon 2 launches.

SpaceX assembles its launch vehicles horizontally in a hangar near the pad, and transports them horizontally to the pad before erecting the vehicle to vertical for the launch. For military missions from Pad 39A, payloads will be vertically integrated, as that is required per launch contract with the USAF.

Pad 39A will be used to host launches of astronauts on the crewed-version of the Dragon space capsule in a public–private partnership with NASA. , the NASA plan called for the first NASA crewed missions in 2017. SpaceX intends to add "a crew gantry access arm and white room to allow for crew and cargo ingress to the vehicle. The existing Space Shuttle evacuation slide-wire basket system will also be re-purposed to provide a safe emergency egress for the Dragon crew in the event of an emergency on the pad that does not necessitate using the Crew Dragon's launch abort system".

In August 2018, SpaceX's Crew Access Arm (CAA) was installed on a new level, which was built at the necessary height to enter the Crew Dragon spacecraft atop a Falcon 9 rocket. It very closely resembles jetways that are frequently found at airports. In September 2018, the refurbished Space Shuttle Emergency Egress System was raised to this new level.

In August 2019, SpaceX submitted an Environmental Assessment for Starship launch system at Kennedy Space Center. This document included plans for the construction of additional structures at LC-39A to support Starship launches, including a dedicated pad, liquid methane tanks, and a Landing Zone. These are separate from the existing structures that support Falcon 9 and Falcon Heavy launches.

In December 2021, Elon Musk announced on Twitter that SpaceX has started construction of a Starship orbital Launchpad at the Cape.

On June 16, 2022, the first integration tower segment for the Starship orbital pad arrived at LC-39A. Stacking began on June 21, and the Starship launch 
mount is also under construction.

List of launches

Apollo program 
For Apollo program launches from LC-39A see the list of uncrewed and crewed Apollo missions.

Skylab program 
For the uncrewed launch of the Skylab space station from LC-39A see Skylab launch.

Space Shuttle program 
For Space Shuttle program launches from LC-39A see List of space shuttle launches.

SpaceX 
For SpaceX launches from LC-39A see List of Falcon 9 and Falcon Heavy launches.

Gallery

See also

References

External links 
 Launch Complex 39-A 
 NASA-produced video tour of Shuttle on Pad 39A 1 month before launch
 photos of work areas and catacombs beneath Pad 39A
 A comprehensive virtual tour over, under, around, and through the infrastructure of Launch Pad 39A
 Cape Canaveral LC39A from Encyclopedia Astronautica

Kennedy Space Center launch sites
1964 establishments in Florida
SpaceX facilities
National Register of Historic Places in Brevard County, Florida
Apollo program
Space Shuttle program
Historic districts on the National Register of Historic Places in Florida
Historic American Engineering Record in Florida
Buildings and structures in Merritt Island, Florida
Constellation program